Arthur Engel (12 January 1928 – 11 November 2022) was a German mathematics teacher, educationalist and prolific author. His work has been translated into several languages. He had played a role in national and international mathematical competitions since 1970. Engel was one of the first to recognize the impact of electronic calculators and computers on mathematics teaching. He viewed that the focus should shift from learning how to apply algorithms, which could now be done by the machine, to learning how to build and test algorithms. He was also early to see the value of using computers to draw students into an interest and understanding of mathematics.

Career
Arthur Engel was born in 1928. He graduated from the University of Stuttgart in 1952, and was a secondary school teacher for 18 years. In 1970 he became an associate professor at the Ludwigsburg University of Education, a teacher's training institution. Engel was a Professor of the Institut für Didaktik der Mathematik und der Informatik (Institute for teaching mathematics and computer science) of Goethe University Frankfurt.

Engel began to push for establishment of the Bundeswettbewerb Mathematik (Federal Mathematics Competition) as early as 1965. The first competition was held in 1970. He was a leader of the first German team to participate in the International Mathematical Olympiad (IMO), held in Belgrade in 1977. He was the leader of the German IMO delegation until 1984. Engel, then at Frankfurt University, chaired the jury of the 30th IMO in Braunschweig, Lower Saxony (13–24 July 1989). An IMO sets six problems for the participants to solve. Two of the 1979 problems were proposed by Engel, and one in each of 1981, 1983, 1986 and 1987.

In 1990 Engel was awarded the Cross of the Order of Merit of the Federal Republic of Germany by the Minister of Education of West Germany. In 1991 he was among the first three recipients of the David Hilbert Award given by the World Federation of National Mathematics Competitions (WFNMC). The award was given for an article he published in 1987 in the WFNMC Journal "Mathematics Competitions" that discussed creating Mathematical Olympiad Problems, covering the different aspects of the subject in detail.

Works
Engel was the author or co-author of numerous textbooks, teaching aids and books and articles on teaching mathematics written in German and English. Some have been translated into French, Spanish and Polish.

In his 1970 paper The Teaching of Probability in the Intermediate Grades, Engel described an activity in which students would first use a spinning device to generate a random series of numbers, then use devices to create a series where the spins were not independent, simulating a Markov process. An Australian teacher built on this to introduce students to a simple model of the weather. In his 1975 Wahrscheinlichkeitsrechnung und Statistik (Probability and Statistics) volume 2, Engel provided a chip-moving algorithm that could be used to determine the basic descriptive qualities of an absorbing Markov chain. The algorithm depended on recurrence of the initial distribution of chips, which Engel said had been proved by L. Scheller but not published. A proof was published in 2006 by J. Laurie Snell.

In his 1984 Elementary Mathematics from an Algorithmic Standpoint Engel had the insight that with computers and calculators widely available, students would no longer accept rote learning of algorithms that could be executed mechanically. He proposed that mathematics in schools should instead focus on the concept of the algorithm, and the syllabus should be completely revised to take an "algorithmic standpoint". His proposed approach would focus on construction and testing of algorithms rather than their execution.

Engel was one of the first to recognize the value of computer programming in teaching mathematics. Engel's 1993 Exploring Mathematics with Your Computer, draws from number theory, probability, statistics, combinatorics, numerical algorithms and many other fields. The book was primarily written for teachers. The book has been criticized for failing to provide motivation before discussing topics, called "a nice idea, not very well executed". However the book has also been called "a collection of gems ... a rich banquet." Another reviewer called this book "an excellent source of ideas for computer-based activities that engage students in mathematical explorations. A third reviewer said "Those who have met examples of Arthur Engel's work will know what to expect, and this is another example of his astonishing versatility."

Engel's 1998 Problem-Solving Strategies has been described as the "most complete training book available for secondary and collegiate mathematics contests ... Beautiful mathematics abounds..."

Partial bibliography

References

1928 births
2022 deaths
University of Stuttgart alumni
20th-century German mathematicians
German educational theorists
20th-century educational theorists
Academic staff of Goethe University Frankfurt
Recipients of the Cross of the Order of Merit of the Federal Republic of Germany
Academic staff of the Ludwigsburg University of Education